Hugh Brunt is a British conductor. He shares with Robert Ames the positions of artistic director and principal conductor of the London Contemporary Orchestra.

Career 
Brunt was a chorister at St George’s Chapel, Windsor Castle and a music scholar at Radley College before attending New College, Oxford, where he was a choral scholar. He co-founded the London Contemporary Orchestra in 2008, along with conductor and violist Robert Ames. Brunt conducted Jonny Greenwood’s soundtrack to Paul Thomas Anderson’s 2012 film The Master, Jed Kurzel’s soundtrack to Justin Kurzel’s 2015 film Macbeth, and the string and choir arrangements on Radiohead's 2016 album A Moon Shaped Pool. He has also collaborated as an arranger and/or conductor with artists including Foals, Imogen Heap, Actress, Beck, and The Smile.

References 

1986 births
Alumni of New College, Oxford
British male conductors (music)
Living people
21st-century British conductors (music)
21st-century British male musicians